is a Japanese voice actress and narrator from Hokkaido. She graduated from Faculty of Economics at Sapporo University. After leaving Marcus and Aoni-juku she is now affiliated with Aoni Production.

Filmography

Anime

1998
El-Hazard (1998)
Sentimental Journey - Rurika Yamamoto
2000
Mushrambo - Kuro (Ep. 23)
2001
Prétear - B-ko (Ep. 1)
Bakuten Shoot Beyblade - Bijo A (Ep. 24); Girl (Ep. 16)
Mamimume Mogacho - Go-gan; Kiiko
Aquarian Age: Sign for Evolution - Girl A
2002
Kikō Sennyo Rōran - Rōran
SaiKano - Rie
2003
Bakuten Shoot Beyblade G Revolution - Matilda
Full Metal Panic? Fumoffu - Kozue Nishino
2004
Soreike! Zukkoke Sanningumi - Yōko Arai
Detective School Q - Arisa Tachiki
Bobobo-bo Bo-bobo - Re-zun Onna (Ep. 26)
2005
Air - Potato
Bobobo-bo Bo-bobo - Kopacchi (Ep. 74) Shaina (Ep. 52-53)
Kidō Shinsengumi Moeyo Ken - Suzaku
Full Metal Panic! The Second Raid - Shiori Kudō
Lime-Iro Senkitan X - Koshi-goe
2006
Angel Heart (manga) - Ta-nya (Ep. 15-16)
Shōnen Onmyōji - Taiin
Yamato Nadesiko Shichi Henge - Laseine
GeGeGe no Kitarou (5th Series) as Neko-Musume
2007
Iwai! (Happy ☆ Lucky) Bikkuriman - Yattemiroku
MapleStory - Maron
Lucky Star - Akira Kogami
Les Misérables: Shōjo Cosette - Marie
2008
Shugo Chara! - Il
Shugo Chara!! Doki— - Il
Skip Beat! - Maria Takarada
Porphy no Nagai Tabi - Colinna
Mahōtsukai ni Taisetsu na Koto - Ruriko Nishihara
on-chan - ok-chan
Yatterman(Remake) - Miki (Ep. 13)
2009
Kiddy Girl-and - Letuchaia
Shugo Chara!! Party - Il
Sora wo Miageru Shōjo no Hitomi ni Utsuru Sekai - Suzume Imamura
Natsu no Arashi! - Shop clerk (Ep. 7)
Metal Fight Beyblade - Yui
2010
Amagami SS - Sae Nakata
2011
Digimon Xros Wars - Lunamon
Aku no Death General to Nanatsu no Ōkoku - Lunamon
Nichijō - Professor (Hakase)
Fractale - Sanko
Mirai Nikki - Kamado Ueshita
2012
Atchi Kotchi - Kana Miyama
Amagami SS+ plus - Sae Nakata
Saki Achiga-hen episode of Side-A - Yae Kobashiri
dumomo & nupepe - Dori-chan
Tanken Driland - Kinopi (Ep. 10)
Digimon Xros Wars: Toki o Kakeru Shōnen Hunter-tachi - Bakomon-chan
2013
Kyōkai no Kanata - Yayoi Kanbara
2014
Tanken Driland - 1000-nen no Mahō - - Handicraft Girl Pocket
Tokyo ESP - Kozuki Kuroi
Minna Atsumare! Falcom Gakuen - Tita
Rail Wars! - Bernina
Minna Atsumare! Falcom Gakuen SC - Tita
World Trigger - Saho Arashiyama
One Piece - Flapper
2015
World Trigger - Izuho Natsume
PriPara - Neko (Ep. 40-140)
2017
Dragon Ball Super - Cus

Original video animation (OVA)
Love and Berry: Dress Up and Dance!, Love
Gate Keepers 21 (2002), Female Student A (ep 1)Kidō Shinsengumi Moeyo Ken (2003), SuzakuMunto (2003), Suzume ImamuraRe: Cutie Honey (2004) Scarlet ClawMunto ~Toki no Kabe wo Koete~ (2005), Suzume ImamuraFull Metal Panic! The Second Raid (2006), Shiori KudōOshiete! Harerun (2006), AyaSakura Taisen: New York NY. (2007), Servant; BastetIsekai no Seikishi Monogatari (2009),Lucky Star OVA (2008), Akira KogamiThe Legend of Heroes: Trails in the Sky - The Animation (2011), Tita RusselKaibutsu Ojō (2011), NakuaNichijō Episode 0 (2011), Professor (Hakase)

Web AnimeMiyakawa-ke no Kūfuku (2013), Akira Kogami

FilmTenjōbito to Akutobito Saigo no Tatakai (2009), Suzume Imamura

TokusatsuHyakujuu Sentai Gaoranger (Pyochan (Child Soul Bird) (Ep. 13-14), Yoochan (Ep. 27))Kamen Rider Fourze (Dark Yuki (Actor by:Fumika Shimizu) (Ep. 43-44)/ Gemini Zodiarts (Ep. 43-44))

Video gamesAirforce Delta Strike as Lilia MihajlovnaSoulcalibur III as Hualin, Luna, Girl 2 in Character Creation modeRiviera: The Promised Land as LinaRune Factory Frontier as CandyOshare Majo: Love and Berry as LoveTales of Symphonia as Seles WilderNora to Toki no Kōbō: Kiri no Mori no Majo as Elsie QuinLuminous Arc 2: Will as Popuri/Pop (Potpourri)Shin Sangokumusou Multi Raid 2 as Beauty YuAmagami as Nakata SaeAzur Lane'' as IJN Shouhou

References

External links
Official agency profile 

1975 births
Living people
Aoni Production voice actors
Japanese video game actresses
Japanese voice actresses
Sapporo University alumni
Voice actresses from Hokkaido
20th-century Japanese actresses
21st-century Japanese actresses